Festuca alatavica is a species in the grass family 
Poaceae.

References

alatavica